Sois Belge et tais-toi! is a Belgian satirical sketch comedy by André Remy, written in 1982. The work, a series of plays, deals principally with Belgian politics and Belgitudes.

External links
 Cours de néerlandais en 7 leçons

Belgian plays
1982 plays
Plays set in Belgium
Cultural depictions of Belgian people
Satirical plays